Sylvan Richardson is a British guitarist, composer, and masseur.

Music
Best known for being the one-time guitarist of Simply Red, after the second album Men and Women and a successful world tour, Richardson left the band after becoming disillusioned with the industry. He then studied composition in New York City. Richardson went on to work with acts such as Andy Sheppard and girl group Cleopatra and many others, as a session bassist and band director.

Richardson has his own group The Sylvan Richardson Band, who are currently based in Manchester. In his spare time, he enjoys squash and Kung Fu.

Masseur
After training as a masseur, in 2009 he made a guest appearance on the BBC comedy quiz show Would I Lie To You?, in which he revealed that he was cyclist Sir Chris Hoy's masseur. On 19 July 2010, Richardson was appointed as Liverpool F.C.'s new masseur.

References

Living people
English male guitarists
Black British musicians
English people of Nigerian descent
English composers
Sports masseurs
Liverpool F.C. non-playing staff
Simply Red members
1965 births